Back Again... No Matter What is the fourth compilation album released by Irish boy band Boyzone. The album was released on 13 October 2008. It became the band's sixth top-ten album in the United Kingdom, charting at No. 4 and staying in the top 100 for 43 non-consecutive weeks; it also peaked at No. 3 in Ireland. Three new recordings were made for the album: "Love You Anyway", "Better" and "Can't Stop Thinking About You", the former two of which were both released as singles in promotion of the album. The three new songs were the first new material recorded by the band in nine years, and the last to be recorded before the death of Stephen Gately. The band's tour in the summer of 2008 was the tenth highest grossing set of concerts for that year.

Track listing

Charts

Weekly charts

Year-end charts

Certifications and sales

References

2008 greatest hits albums
Boyzone albums
2008 video albums
Music video compilation albums
Universal Records compilation albums
Universal Records video albums